Gusheh-ye Olya (also Romanized as Gusheh-ye ‘Olyā and Goosheh Olya; also known as Kūsheh-ye Bālā, Gūsheh-ye Bālā, Kusheh Aulia, Kūsheh Bālā, Kūsheh ‘Olyā, and Kusheh-ye ‘Olyā) is a village in Khusf Rural District, Central District, Khusf County, South Khorasan Province, Iran. At the 2006 census, its population was 193, in 53 families.

References 

Populated places in Khusf County